The French ironclad Friedland  was originally intended to be an iron-hulled version of  armoured frigate built for the French Navy during the 1870s, but she was much altered during her prolonged construction. Named after the French victory at the Battle of Friedland in 1807, the ship spent the bulk of her career assigned to the Mediterranean Squadron and supported the French occupation of Tunisia in 1881. She was condemned in 1902.

Design and description
Friedland was a central battery ironclad with the armament concentrated amidships. Like most ironclads of her era she was fitted with a plough-shaped ram.

Her crew numbered around 750 officers and men.

Five  watertight bulkheads divided the hull into compartments, although they only reached up to the main deck. Friedland did not have a double bottom. The metacentric height of the ship was low, a little above .

Propulsion
Friedland had one Indret 3-cylinder horizontal return connecting rod compound steam engine driving a single propeller. Its engine was powered by eight oval boilers. On sea trials the engine produced  and Friedland reached . Friedland was initially ship rigged with three masts, then barque-rigged and finally fore-and-aft rigged after her mainmast was removed.

Armament and Armour
Two 274-millimetre Modèle 1870 guns were mounted in barbettes on the upper deck, one gun at the forward corner of the battery, with the remaining six 274-millimetre Modèle 1870 guns on the battery deck below the barbettes. Eight 138-millimetre Modèle 1870 guns were on the upper deck, fore and aft of the barbettes, and on the battery deck.

The guns could fire both solid shot and explosive shells.

At some point the ship received 22  Hotchkiss 5-barrel revolving guns. They had a rate of fire of about 30 rounds per minute. The hull was not recessed to enable any of the guns on the battery deck to fire forward or aft. However, the guns mounted in the barbettes sponsoned out over the sides of the hull did have some ability to fire fore and aft. In 1884 two above-water  torpedo tubes were added. Two more were added in 1891.

Friedland had a complete  wrought iron waterline belt. The barbettes were unarmoured.

Service
Friedland was laid down at Lorient in January 1865 and launched on 15 October 1873. While the exact reason for such prolonged construction time is not known, the budget for the French Navy was cut after the Franco-Prussian War of 1870–71 and the French dockyards had not been reformed with working practices more suitable for the industrial age. The ship began her sea trials on 1 May 1875, but was not completed until 20 June 1877. Friedland joined the Mediterranean Squadron in 1878 and the ship bombarded the Tunisian port of Sfax from 6–16 July 1881 as part of the French occupation of Tunisia. She was reduced to reserve in 1887 and decommissioned in 1893. Friedland returned to active duty in 1893, but was paid off in 1898 and condemned in 1902.

Footnotes

References

External links
  classe Friedland

Ships built in France
Ironclad warships of the French Navy
1873 ships